SuperStar Search Slovakia is a casting television show based on the popular British show Pop Idol. The show is a contest to determine the best young singer in Slovakia and is shown by the private TV network Markíza. The third season premiered in September 2007 with castings held in Banská Bystrica, Žilina, Bratislava and Košice.

Regional auditions
Auditions were held in Bratislava, Košice, Banská Bystrica, Žilina in the summer of 2007.

Divadlo
In Divadlo where 100 contestants. The contestants first emerged on stage in groups of 9 or 10 but performed solo unaccompanied, and those who did not impress the judges were cut after the group finished their individual performances. 22 contestants made it to the Semi-final.

Semi-final
22 semifinalists were revealed in September when the show premiered on screen. Eleven boys and eleven girls competed for a spot in the top 10. In three Semifinals the guys performed on Saturday and the girls on Sunday night. The following Monday the lowest vote getter from each gender got eliminated.

Top 22 - Females

Top 22 - Males

Top 16 - Females

Top 16 - Males

Top 14 - Females

Top 14 - Males

Finalist

Finals
Ten contestants made it to the finals. The first single recorded by TOP 10 is called "Dotkni sa hviezd" (Touch the Stars) and it was composed by judge Pavol Habera (music) and slovak poem writer Daniel Hevier. Every final night has its theme. Audience can vote for contestants from the very beginning of the show, voting ends during result show on the next day.

Top 10 – Year They Were Born

Top 9 – Rock

Top 8 – Balads

Top 7 – Dance

Top 6 – Big Bands and Duets

Top 5 – Miroslav Žbirka

Top 4 – Unplugged

Top 3 – Idol's Choice

Top 2 – Grand Final

 TOP 10 Performance: Happy Xmas  (Plastic Ono Band)

Elimination chart

External links 
 Official Season 3 Site
 Unofficial site

Season 03
2007 Slovak television seasons